Shobugawa Dam is a gravity concrete & fill dam (compound) dam located in Yamagata Prefecture in Japan. The dam is used for irrigation. The catchment area of the dam is 11 km2. The dam impounds about 5  ha of land when full and can store 545 thousand cubic meters of water. The construction of the dam was completed in 1973.

References

Dams in Yamagata Prefecture
1973 establishments in Japan